The 1987 Cal State Northridge  Matadors football team represented California State University, Northridge as a member of the Western Football Conference (WFC) during the 1987 NCAA Division II football season. Led by second-year head coach Bob Burt, Cal State Northridge compiled an overall record of 7–4 with a mark of 4–2 in conference play, placing second in the WFC. The team outscored its opponents 258 to 222 for the season. The Matadors played home games at North Campus Stadium in Northridge, California.

Schedule

References

Cal State Northridge
Cal State Northridge Matadors football seasons
Cal State Northridge Matadors football